Kulla Chapel is a chapel in Eksjö Municipality in Sweden, located down country road 28 between Eksjö and Nässjö. Belonging to the Höreda Parish of the Church of Sweden, it was opened in 1927.

The chapel was destroyed in a fire on 27 May 2000, connected to Satanism, but was rebuilt and reopened on 13 May 2001.

See also
Bäckaby Old Church

References

External links

2000 fires in Europe
20th-century Church of Sweden church buildings
Churches in Jönköping County
Chapels in Sweden
Churches completed in 1927
Churches in the Diocese of Linköping